This is a list of extant schools, excluding universities and higher education establishments, that have been in continuous operation since founded. The dates refer to the foundation or the earliest documented contemporaneous reference to the school.

Sixth century
 The King's School, Canterbury, England (597)

Seventh century
 The King's School, Rochester, England (604)
 St Peter's School, York, England (627)
 Thetford Grammar School, Thetford, England (631), first conclusive evidence (1114)
 Royal Grammar School, Worcester, England (685), first conclusive evidence (1291)
Beverley Grammar School, England (700), oldest state school in England
, St. Gallen, Switzerland (ending 7th century, exact date not clear), founded by Saint Othmar

Eighth century
 Sherborne School, England (705)
 , Eichstätt, Germany (c. 740), founded by Willibald
 Fulda monastery school, Fulda, Germany (748), founded by Sturmi
 Gymnasium Paulinum, Germany (797)
 Gymnasium Theodorianum, Germany (799)

Ninth century
 Gymnasium Carolinum, Osnabrück, Germany (804), founded by Charles the Great (Charlemagne)
Domgymnasium Hildesheim, Hildesheim, Germany (c. 815), founded by Louis the Pious 
 , Xanten, Germany (exact founding date not clear)

Tenth century
 Wells Cathedral School, England (c.909)
 Warwick School, England (914)
 St Albans School, England (948)
 The Minster School, Southwell, England (c. 956)
 The King's School, Ely, England (970)
 Pannonhalma Benedictine College, Hungary (996), founded by Grand Prince Géza of Hungary

Eleventh century
 Roskilde Katedralskole, Denmark (c. 1020)
 Suzhou High School, China (1035)
 Menntaskólinn í Reykjavík, Iceland (1056)
 Viborg Katedralskole, Denmark (c.1060)
 Katedralskolan, Lund, Sweden (1085), originally part of Denmark, despite the many Danish-Swedish wars continuously operating since it was founded.
 Salisbury Cathedral School, England (1091)
 Norwich School, England (1096)
Abingdon School, England (1100, endowed 1256, refounded 1563)

Twelfth century
 St Paul's Cathedral School, England (1123)
 High School of Glasgow, Scotland (pre-1124)
 Reading School, England (1125) 
 Royal High School, Edinburgh, Scotland (1128)
 Stirling High School, Scotland (1129)
 Stiftsgymnasium Melk, Austria (pre-1140)
 Bristol Cathedral School, England (1140)
 Ribe Katedralskole, Denmark (1145)
 Trondheim katedralskole, Norway (c. 1152)
 Bergen katedralskole, Norway (1153)
 Oslo katedralskole, Norway (1153)
 Derby School, England (1160)
 , France (1161)
 Westminster School, England (1179)
 Małachowianka, Poland (1180)
 Lanark Grammar School, Scotland (1183)
 Aarhus Katedralskole, Denmark (1195)
 Paulo Pontine, later Bedford School, Bedford, England (Date Uncertain, refounded by Edward VI 1552, see below)

Thirteenth century
 Colchester Royal Grammar School, England (pre-1206)
 Metropolitanskolen, Denmark (1209)
 Riga State Gymnasium No.1, Latvia (1211)
 Thomasschule zu Leipzig, Germany (1212)
 Ayr Academy, Scotland (1233)
 Lancaster Royal Grammar School, England (1235) 
 High School of Dundee, Scotland (1239)
 , Ji'an, China (1241)
 Harrow School, England (1243, Royal Charter in 1572)
 Katedralskolan, Uppsala, Sweden (exact year of foundation not known, by tradition 1246)
 , Germany (1250)
 , Dordrecht, The Netherlands (1253) (oldest school in The Netherlands)
 Abingdon School, England (1256)
 Aberdeen Grammar School, Scotland (1257)
 , The Netherlands (exact year of foundation unknown, but first mentioned in 1274)
 Cathedral School in Turku, Finland (1276)
 King Edward VI Grammar School, Louth, England (1276)
 Ruthin School, Denbighshire, Wales (1284)
 King Edward VI Grammar School, Stratford-upon-Avon (1295 refounded 1553)
 Stedelijk Gymnasium Leiden, The Netherlands (first mentioned 1323, but year of foundation is estimated mid 13th Century)

Fourteenth century
 Stamford School, England (c.1309 but re-endowed 1532) 
 Northallerton School, England (1323)
 Hanley Castle High School, England (1326)
 Gymnasium Erasmianum, The Netherlands (1328)
 , Celle, Germany (1328)
 , Warendorf, Germany (1329) 
 The King's School, Grantham, Lincolnshire, England (1329) refounded (1528)
 Bourne Grammar School Lincolnshire, England (1330)
 Hull Grammar School, England (1330)
 King's School Ottery St. Mary, England (1335)
 Barlaeus Gymnasium, Amsterdam, Netherlands (1342)
 Bablake School, England (1344) 
 Instituto San Isidro, Spain (1346)
 St George's School, Windsor Castle, England (1348) 
 Charles University, Czech Republic (1348)
 Doncaster Grammar School / Hall Cross School, England (1350)
 Beauchamp College, England (1359)
 Jagiellonian University, Poland (1364)
 Sint Maartensschool (name later changed into Praedinius Gymnasium), The Netherlands (1375)
 Prince Henry's High School, England (c1376)
 , Amersfoort, The Netherlands (1376) 
 New College School, England (1379)
 Wisbech Grammar School,Wisbech,  England (1379)
 Knox Academy, Scotland (1379)
 Samuel von Brukenthal National College, Sibiu, Romania (1380) - originally part of Hungary
 Winchester College, Winchester, England (1382)
 Hereford Cathedral School,Hereford,  England (1384)
 Katharine Lady Berkeley's School, Wotton-under-Edge, England (1384)
 Stedelijk Gymnasium Haarlem, the Netherlands (1389)
 Halepaghen Grammar School, Germany (1390)
 Penistone Grammar School, Penistone, England (1392)
 Gymnasium Haganum, The Netherlands (1394)
 Cathedral School of Vilnius, Lithuania (founded before 1397)
 Ipswich School, Suffolk, England (1399) (first record of existence)
Chorister School, Durham, England (c.1400)

Fifteenth century

  , Sweden (1406)
 Oswestry School, England (1407) 
 Durham School, England (1414) (possibly 635)
 Aberdeen Grammar School, Scotland (1418) (possibly 1257) 
 Royal Latin School, England (1423) 
 Brechin High School, Scotland (1429)
 Sponne School, England (1430)
 St. Patrick's Cathedral Choir School, Dublin, Ireland (1432)
 Sevenoaks School, England (1432) 
 Eton College, England (1440)
 Chipping Campden School, England (c1440)
 King's College School, Cambridge, England (1441)
 City of London School, England (1442) 
 Adams' Grammar School, England (1442) 
 Bridlington School, England (1447)
 Dreikönigsgymnasium, Cologne, Germany (1450)
 Phanar Greek Orthodox College, Istanbul, Turkey (1454)
 St. Bartholomew's School, England (1466)
 Dunfermline High School, Scotland (1468)
 Bromsgrove School (record of a chantry school 1476, re-founded 1553)
 Magdalen College School, Oxford, England (1480) 
 Galatasaray High School, Istanbul, Turkey (1481)
 Skegness Grammar School, England (1483)
 Stockport Grammar School, England (1487) 
 Ermysted's Grammar School, England (1492) (first record of existence)
 King Edward VI School, Lichfield, England (1495)
 Loughborough Grammar School, England (1495)
 The Prebendal School, England (1497)
 Queen Elizabeth's School, Wimborne Minster, England (1497)
 Alcester Grammar School, England (1498)

Sixteenth century
 Queen Elizabeth's Grammar School, Blackburn, England (1509)
 Royal Grammar School, Guildford, England (1509)
 St Paul's School, London, England (1509)
 Giggleswick School, England (1512)
 Lewes Old Grammar School, England (1512)
 Wolverhampton Grammar School, England (1512)
 Nottingham High School, England (1513)
 Pocklington Grammar School, England (1514)
 Manchester Grammar School, England (1515)
 Gillingham School, Dorset, England (1516)
 Bolton School, England (1516) (exact year of foundation unknown, but first mentioned in 1516)
 Cranbrook School, Kent, England (1518)
 King's School, Bruton, England (1519)
 Sedbergh School, England (1525)
 Royal Grammar School, Newcastle upon Tyne, England (1525)
 Bishop Vesey's Grammar School, England (1527)
 , Germany (1527)
 Bingley Grammar School, West Yorkshire, England (1529)
 Magnus Grammar School, England (1531)
 Bristol Grammar School, England (1532)
 Nicolas Gibson Free School now the Coopers' Company and Coborn School, England (1536)
 Elizabethan Grammar School now Wyggeston and Queen Elizabeth I College, England (1536)
 , Sarajevo, Bosnia and Herzegovina (1537)
 Kilkenny College. Ireland (1538)
 The Crypt School, Gloucester, England (1539)
 Christ College, Brecon, Wales (1541) 
 The King's School, Peterborough, England (1541)
 The King's School, Worcester, England (1541)
 The King's School, Gloucester, England (1541)
 The King's School, Chester, England (1541)
 Berkhamsted School, Hertfordshire, England (1541)
 Northampton School for Boys, Northampton, England (1541)
 King Henry VIII School, Abergavenny, Wales (1542)
 Dauntsey's School, Wiltshire, England (1542)
 , Dortmund, Germany (1543)
 , Nijmegen, Netherlands (1544)
 , Düsseldorf, Germany (1545)
 Christ Church Cathedral School, Oxford, England (1546) 
 Colyton Grammar School, Colyford, Devon, England (1546)
 Bradford Grammar School, Bradford, Yorkshire, England (1548)
 Kirkham Grammar School, England (1549)
 Maidstone Grammar School, Maidstone, England (1549)
 King Edward VI School, Bury St Edmunds, England (1550)
 King Edward VI Grammar School, Chelmsford, Essex, England (1551)
 Royal Grammar School, High Wycombe, England (1551)
 Leeds Grammar School, Leeds, England (1552)
 King Edward's School, Birmingham, England (1552)
 King Edward's School, Bath England (1552)
 Shrewsbury School, England (1552)
 Christ's Hospital, England (1552)
 Hutton Grammar School, England (1552; endowed 1522)
 Akademisches Gymnasium (Vienna), Austria (1553)
 Tonbridge School, England (1553)
 King Edward VI School, Southampton, England (1553)
 Queen Mary's Grammar School, England (1554)
 Boston Grammar School, England (1555)
 Ripon Grammar School, England (1555)
 Laxton Grammar School, England (1556)
 Hampton School, England (1556)
 , Prague, Czech Republic (1556)
 Brentwood School, England (1557)
 Friars School, Bangor, Wales (1557)
 Tadcaster Grammar School, England (1557)
 , Gävle, Sweden (1557)  (In 1669 absorbing , founded in 1640.)
 Enfield Grammar School, England (1558) (absorbing and replacing the Enfield chantry-school 1398–1558).
 Thomas Alleyne's High School, Uttoxeter, England (1558)
 Repton School, England (1559)
 Solihull School, England (1560)
 Leith Academy, Scotland (1560)
 Westminster Abbey Choir School, England (1560)
 Kingston Grammar School, England (1561)
 Colegio Nuestra Señora de Montesión, Spain (1561)
 St Olave's Grammar School, England (1561)
 Merchant Taylors' School, Northwood, England (1561)
 Queen Elizabeth's Academy, England (1561)
 Akademisches Gymnasium Innsbruck, Austria (1562)
 Elizabeth College, Guernsey (1563)
 Sir Roger Manwood's School, England (1563)
 Felsted School, England (1564)
 Herlufsholm Boarding School, Denmark (1565)
 Highgate School, England (1565)
 Ashby School, England (1567)
Rugby School, England (1567)
 The Royal School of Dunkeld, Scotland (1567) (Royal Charter granted in the name of King James VI of Scotland)
 Richmond School, England (1568)
Bury Grammar School, England (1570)
St Mary Redcliffe and Temple School, England (1571)
 Queen Elizabeth's School, Barnet, England (1573)
 Dartford Grammar School, England (1576)
 Sutton Valence School, England (1576)
 Paisley Grammar School, Scotland (1577)
 Vilnius University, Lithuania (1579)
 Kirkcudbright Academy (earliest record of existence 1582)
 St. Bees School, England (1583)
 , Como, Italy (1583)
 Oakham School, England (1584)
 Uppingham School, England (1584)
Queen Elizabeth's Grammar School, Ashbourne, England (1585)
Queen Elizabeth's Hospital, England (1586)
 Spalding Grammar School, England (1588)
 Joyce Frankland Academy, England (1588) (formerly Newport Free Grammar School)
 Queen Elizabeth Grammar School, Wakefield, England (1591)
 Queen Elizabeth School, Kirkby Lonsdale, England (1591)
 Stonyhurst College, England (1593)
 Emanuel School, England (1594)
 , Germany (1595)
 Whitgift School, England (1596)
 Aldenham School, England (1597)
 Aylesbury Grammar School, England (1598)
 Queen Elizabeth High School, Hexham, England (1599)

See also
 List of the oldest public high schools in the United States
 List of the oldest schools in Sri Lanka
 List of the oldest schools in the United Kingdom
 List of oldest universities in continuous operation
 The oldest independent schools in the UK
 List of oldest institutions in continuous operation

References

Bibliography
 

 
 
Schools
Lists of education-related superlatives